Muhammad Qasim Sadiq, commonly known as Baba Ji Sarkar (died November 21, 1943), was a Sufi sheikh and acclaimed saint who died near the hill station, Murree in the town of Mohra Sharif, which is presently in Pakistan. This is where his urn is kept. 

Hazrat Khawaja Baba Ji, who was born in 1822, lived for 120 years. is a remarkable tale of Islamic Rebirth in this Asian region. He had completed his study in several Islamic disciplines by the age of twenty. He committed himself to praying and teaching the religion of Islam after completing his studies.

References

Pakistani Sufis
1822 births
1943 deaths
Shrines in Pakistan
Murree